was a Japanese football player. He played for Japan national team.

National team career
In May 1934, when Natori was a Waseda University student, he was selected Japan national team for 1934 Far Eastern Championship Games in Manila. At this competition, on May 20, he debuted and scored a goal against Republic of China.

National team statistics

References

External links
 
 Japan National Football Team Database

Year of birth missing
Year of death missing
Waseda University alumni
Japanese footballers
Japan international footballers
Association football forwards